Christopher Cortemeglia (September 21, 1903 – March 14, 1989) was an American football player.

A native of Bryan, Texas, Cortemeglia played college football for SMU. He was selected by John Heisman as a first-team halfback on the 1925 All-Southwest Conference football team. He played professional football in the National Football League (NFL) as a wingback for the Frankford Yellow Jackets during 1927 season. He appeared in a total of two NFL games.

References

1903 births
1989 deaths
People from Bryan, Texas
SMU Mustangs football players
Frankford Yellow Jackets players
Players of American football from Texas